Richard Zedník (born 6 January 1976) is a Slovak former professional ice hockey winger. He had a 15-year career in the National Hockey League (NHL), playing for the Washington Capitals, Montreal Canadiens, New York Islanders and Florida Panthers.

Zedník is known for sustaining and surviving a life-threatening injury during a February 2008 NHL game when the skate of his teammate Olli Jokinen accidentally sliced his common carotid artery.

Playing career 
Zedník was drafted in the 1994 NHL Entry Draft by the Washington Capitals, in the tenth round, 249th overall, after playing junior hockey for the Portland Winter Hawks of the Western Hockey League (WHL).

Zedník scored 35 goals in his rookie year with the Winter Hawks during the 1994–95 season. In his second year with the major junior team, he scored 44 goals which earned him Second Team All-Star honours. Zedník made his professional debut at the end of the 1995–96 season, playing in a single game with the Capitals before joining their minor league affiliate, the Portland Pirates of the American Hockey League (AHL), for their Calder Cup finals playoff run. Zedník made the Capitals' roster out of training camp in 1996 and scored his first career NHL goal in the season opener on October 5 against Ed Belfour of the Chicago Blackhawks. After one goal in nine games, Zedník was sent down to Portland before being recalled briefly in March 1997.

Zedník played his first full NHL season in 1997–98, playing in 65 games with the Capitals and recording 17 goals. Zednik scored the first Capitals goal in Capital One Arena (then MCI Center) history.

On October 31, 2000, a local Washington, D.C., radio station, DC101, had a promotion in which they offered fans a free ticket and Zedník jersey if they dyed their hair blond as Zedník had in the off-season. It was Zedník's first game off of a suspension. Two-hundred "Zed Heads" attended the game at which Zedník scored his first career hat-trick against the Detroit Red Wings, who had not lost in Washington in ten years.

After spending six seasons with the Capitals, Zedník was traded during the 2000–01 season, along with Jan Bulis and a first-round draft pick (used to select Alexander Perezhogin), to the Montreal Canadiens in exchange for Trevor Linden, Dainius Zubrus and a second-round draft pick (later traded to the Tampa Bay Lightning) on March 13, 2001.

On April 26, 2002, during a playoff game in Montreal against the Boston Bruins, Zedník was elbowed in the face by Bruins defenceman Kyle McLaren. Zedník suffered a fractured cheekbone, broken nose and a concussion. Despite the Canadiens losing the game 5–2 and Zedník for the remainder of the playoffs, they would win the series 4–2.

After playing the next three years in Montreal, Zedník was traded back to the Capitals on July 12, 2006, in exchange for a third-round draft pick. Zedník's second stint back with the Capitals was short as he was dealt at the trade deadline to the New York Islanders for a second-round draft pick on February 26, 2007.

At the conclusion of the 2006–07 season, Zedník, a free agent, signed a two-year contract with the Florida Panthers on July 1, 2007.

On April 30, 2009, Zedník was announced as a Masterton Trophy finalist for the 2008–09 season. His nomination coincided with an official announcement that Zedník signed to play for Lokomotiv Yaroslavl in the Kontinental Hockey League (KHL) for the 2009–10 season. Zedník's contract with Lokomotiv Yaroslaval was terminated "by mutual agreement" in the summer of 2010.

Zedník then played two games with HC 05 Banská Bystrica of the Slovak Extraliga. On January 10, 2011, he signed a contract with AIK IF, which expired after the 2010–11 Elitserien season.

Neck injury 
On February 10, 2008, in a game where the Florida Panthers were playing the Buffalo Sabres, Zedník suffered a severe and life-threatening injury. Teammate Olli Jokinen was tangled up with Sabre Clarke MacArthur and lost his balance in front of Zedník. Zedník was skating past as Jokinen fell, and his skate blade accidentally made contact with Zedník's neck, slicing his common carotid artery open and causing it to expel a trail of blood onto the ice as Zedník reacted quickly and skated to the Panthers' bench. He was immediately attended to by Florida trainer Dave Zenobi, who took him to the locker room for treatment. Paramedics, who are on standby at every NHL game, stabilized Zedník while the home team doctor Les Bisson controlled the bleeding. Bisson noted that Zedník appeared to be in shock but was not near death, as he was alert and responsive.  Zedník lost five pints of blood (2,3L). Zedník was transported to hospital on emergency run, his status being published as stable after leaving the arena. The game was delayed for more than 20 minutes as the zamboni was needed to help remove the blood from the ice. The announcement over the public address speakers at HSBC Arena that Zedník was in stable condition and en route to a Buffalo, New York, hospital sparked a prolonged standing ovation from the Buffalo fans as the game went on as planned.

Emergency surgery was performed to repair the artery, but according to doctors at Buffalo General Hospital, Zedník's life was not in jeopardy. The artery was not severed; had it been, it would have recessed into the neck, requiring more extensive surgery to repair. Zedník was stable in the Intensive Care Unit through February 12 and released from hospital on February 16, but missed the rest of the season recovering from the injury. He received a lot of support for his injury by fans and fellow hockey players alike.

Zedník watched the video replay of his injury and said "once is enough". He said the extent of the injury was immediately obvious to him, as it felt like being stabbed.

He returned to play in the 2008–09 season.

Zedník's injury drew comparisons of a similar injury suffered by Clint Malarchuk, who was a goalkeeper for the Buffalo Sabres back in 1989. The injuries both prompted discussion about neck guards and player safety in the NHL. At present, team doctors (practitioners of sports medicine) are trained in trauma care and are required to be seated behind the home team bench at every game.

Personal life 
Zedník married French-Canadian actress Jessica Welch in 2005. They divorced in 2009 and have one daughter.

Career statistics

Regular season and playoffs

International

International play 
Played for Slovakia in:

 2006, 2010 Winter Olympic Games
 World Championships – 2001, 2003 (bronze medal), 2005, 2011
 World Cup of Hockey – 1996, 2004
 Team Slovakia – 45 caps / 10 goals
 Ball Hockey World Championships – 1999 (gold medal)

Awards
 WHL West Second All-Star Team – 1996

See also 
 List of Slovaks in the NHL
 Clint Malarchuk – Another hockey player who also survived an accidental neck slicing by ice skate.

References

External links 
 
 
 
 
 

1976 births
Living people
Sportspeople from Banská Bystrica
Florida Panthers players
Ice hockey players at the 2006 Winter Olympics
Ice hockey players at the 2010 Winter Olympics
AIK IF players
Lokomotiv Yaroslavl players
Montreal Canadiens players
New York Islanders players
Olympic ice hockey players of Slovakia
Portland Pirates players
Portland Winterhawks players
Slovak ice hockey right wingers
Washington Capitals players
Washington Capitals draft picks
Slovak expatriate ice hockey players in Russia
Slovak expatriate ice hockey players in Canada
Slovak expatriate ice hockey players in the United States
Slovak expatriate ice hockey players in Sweden